The Maribor Slovene National Theatre (SNG Maribor) is a theatre in Maribor, northeastern Slovenia. Its performances of drama, opera, and ballet annually attract the country's largest theatrical audiences.

Performances
The theatre regularly hosts the Ljubljana Slovene National Theatre Opera and Ballet. In January 2012 performances of Marij Kogoj's opera Black Masks were scheduled.

See also
 Ljubljana Slovene National Theatre Drama, Ljubljana
 Ljubljana Slovene National Theatre Opera and Ballet, Ljubljana
 Nova Gorica Slovene National Theatre

External links
Official website

Culture in Maribor
Theatres in Maribor